MasterChef is a Spanish competitive reality television cooking show based on the British television cooking game show of the same title. It premiered on La 1 on 10 April 2013. The show is, nowadays, presented by Pepe Rodríguez, Jordi Cruz and Samantha Vallejo-Nágera, who are also the judges of the competition.

History
In the first season, only 15 people were chosen from among the 9,000 in the initial casting selection and competed for the title of MasterChef. The winner was given 100,000 euros, the opportunity to publish his own book of recipes, and the chance to attend the esteemed culinary school Le Cordon Bleu.

The initial selections began on February 4, 2013 in five areas of the country. All types of people came, including high-level executives, housewives, and construction workers. All of the candidates came together over their love of cooking. They had to be amateur cooks without culinary experience, but at the same time very talented.

The contestants competed against each other in individual challenges in the kitchen and also in group challenges outside of the set kitchen. The judges were Pepe Rodríguez, Jordi Cruz, and Samanta Vallejo-Nágera. The first season aired on La 1 of Televisión Española starting on April 10, 2013, and was hosted by Eva González.

In October 2013, MasterChef received the Ondas Awards for the best entertainment program in Spanish television.

Show format
 Caja misteriosa (Mystery Box Challenge). The contestants receive ingredients with which they have to make a dish according to the specifications of the judges. The contestants have a certain amount of time in order to do this. Once they are finished, the judges deliberate and the two to three best dishes determine who will be the captains in the following challenge.
 Prueba por equipos (Team Challenge). This challenge takes place outside of the kitchens of Masterchef and involves cooking for celebrities or other groups of people. The captains have to decide on the dishes that they are going to prepare and which of the other contestants will be on their team to help them. The losing team then faces off in the elimination round.
 Prueba de eliminación (Elimination Test). The winning team observes the losing team from the gallery from in the final challenge. The losing team has to cook the recipe chosen by the judges. The judges «deliberate» and the contestant that has made the «worst» dish is eliminated from the program.
 Prueba de presión (Pressure Test). This is the most difficult challenge. A celebrity chef visits the set and instructs the contestants on how to make his most famous dish. The contestants have to then recreate it.
 Reto creativo (Creative Test). The judges dictate which dish the contestants have to make.

First season (2013)
Fifteen amateur chefs competed in different challenges cooking alone or in teams, both in the set kitchen and elsewhere. Throughout the first season of MasterChef, the contestants were visited by the best chefs in Spain who gave them exclusive cooking classes. These included Juan Mari Arzak, Pedro Subijana, Joan Roca, Paco Roncero, Dani García, Quique Dacosta, Eneko Atxa, and Andoni Luis Aduriz, among others. The finale featured Spanish chef Ferran Adrià, considered the best chef in the world, as one of the judges.

Contestants

Second season (2014)
During the finale of the first season of MasterChef, Eva González told viewers that the program would be renewed for a second season in May 2014, after MasterChef Junior. Starting in late October 2013 Televisión Española and Shine Iberia started casting for the second season. It premiered on April 9. During the week before, Radiotelevisión Española aired various cooking specials to lead up to the show.

Contestants

Third season (2015)
Televisión Española and Shine Iberia started casting for the third season in December 2014. It premiered on April 7, 2015.

Contestants

Fourth season (2016)

Contestants

Fifth season (2017)

Contestants

Sixth season (2018)
The casting of the sixth season finished on January 15, 2018, 150 of the 23.000 participant was chosen to be challengers, in which only 15 will be candidates to win the program. It was released on April 22, 2018 in La 1. It will be the most demanding season.

Despite being pregnant, Eva González will not be replaced, although she will be absent after the 6th episode.

Contestants

Seventh season (2019)

Contestants

Eighth season (2020)
The show begun on April 14, 2020. Almost 30,000 people attended the castings but only 50 went to the final phase where the judges decided which one attended the first task.

For the first time in the series, due to no eliminated contestant managing to cook a decent enough dish in the repechage episode, no one was brought back by the judges. Instead, they gave candidates eliminated in the last casting process a second chance to join the kitchens. Carlos won and entered the show.

Contestants

Ninth season (2021)
In episode 6, two frontline workers that couldn't participate in the last casting stage due to the COVID-19 pandemic were given a second chance to enter the game as they'll battle for a white apron and the chance to enter the game. José beat Nando, and entered the kitchens.

Contestants

Tenth season (2022)

Contestants

Ratings
Colour key (nominal):
  – Highest rating during the season
  – Lowest rating during the season

Awards

|-
! scope="row" | 2013
| Premios de la Crítica de FesTVal
| Best interesting program
| rowspan=6|MasterChef Spain
| rowspan=6 style="background:#9EFF9E; color: #000;"|Winner
| 
|-
! scope="row" | 2013
| Lovie Awards
| Best TV program
| 
|-
! scope="row" | 2013
| Premios Ondas
| rowspan=2|Best entertaining program
| 
|-
! scope="row" | 2014
| Premios Zapping
| 
|-
! scope="row" | 2018
| Premios Iris
| Best production
| 
|-
! scope="row" | 2020
| Premios Ondas
| Best entertaining program
| 
|}

References

Spanish TV series
2013 Spanish television series debuts
Spanish reality television series
La 1 (Spanish TV channel) original programming
Spanish television series based on British television series